Wade is an unincorporated community in Washington County, in the U.S. state of Ohio.

History
A former variant name was Ostend. A post office called Ostend was established in 1842, the name was changed to Wade in 1864, the post office closed in 1956. The present name is for Benjamin Wade, a United States Senator from Ohio (1851-1869).

References

Unincorporated communities in Washington County, Ohio
Unincorporated communities in Ohio